Kunja Bihari Meher was an Indian master craftsman and weaver from Odisha. Born in the Bargarh district, he is known for the Ikkat tradition (tie and dye) of weaving, found in the Sambalpuri sarees of Odisha, and is credited with the development of Sambalpuri handloom industry. He was awarded the fourth highest civilian award of the Padma Shri by the Government of India, in 1998. He won the National Award for Handicrafts of the National Centre for Textile Design in 2009. His son, Surendra Meher, is also a known weaver.

References 

1928 births
Living people
Recipients of the Padma Shri in arts
People from Bargarh district
Indian weavers